The 1997–98 season was the 52nd season in Rijeka's history. It was their 7th season in the Prva HNL and 24th successive top tier season.

Competitions

Prva HNL

Classification

First stage

Second stage (relegation play-off)

Results summary

Results by round

Matches

Prva HNL

Source: HRnogomet.com

Croatian Cup

Source: HRnogomet.com

Squad statistics
Competitive matches only.  Appearances in brackets indicate numbers of times the player came on as a substitute.

See also
1997–98 Prva HNL
1997–98 Croatian Cup

References

External sources
 1997–98 Prva HNL at HRnogomet.com
 1997–98 Croatian Cup at HRnogomet.com 
 Prvenstvo 1997.-98. at nk-rijeka.hr

HNK Rijeka seasons
Rijeka